Hind Dehiba Chahyd (born 17 March 1979, Bejaâd, Morocco) is a Moroccan-French runner who specializes in the 1500 metres.

Early career
Her first podium finish at the 2005 European Athletics Indoor Championships came with controversy. She took the bronze medal but impeded fourth-placed Helen Clitheroe in the final stages of the 1500 m. However, Clitheroe's appeal was not successful and Dehiba came away with her first European medal.

At the age of 14, she ran 1500m in 4 min 21 s  barefoot and 3000m in 9 min 26 s. She was subsequently selected by Said Aouita (DTN Moroccan at the time) for his first international competition in 1994 at the African Junior Championships in Algiers (Algeria). She was placed sixth in the 3,000 m junior when she was still only 14 years. She became vice-world champion High school cross country in 1996 in Turkey (youngest world champion cross country team).

To complete her education Hind completely stopped competing from July 1998 to June 2003. On resumption of her running in 2003 qualified for the Championship of France Elite 2003 Narbonne at 800m.

In December 2002, she met her husband, Fodil Dehiba in France, and married in 2003 and obtained French nationality before the close of entries for the Athens Olympic Games. At the Athens Olympics, she ran for France and ranked eighth in the third qualifying round of the 1500 m, taking the last qualifying spot in the semifinals.

Hind won the bronze medal at the European Indoor Championships in Madrid in 1500 m. in March 2005 and in 2010 she won the silver medal at the European Championships in Barcelona at 1500m.

In 2005, she was the second meeting of the Paris Saint-Denis and set a new record of France of 1500 m in Rieti in 4 min 00 s 49. 
During the winter of 2006, it ranks 4th in the final of the World Indoor Championships in 1500 m in Moscow, she beat the record of France in 4 min 05 s 63.
During the winter of 2012, it ranks fifth of the World Indoor Championships in Istanbul in 1500. She will recover the world bronze medal after the disqualification of two athletes for doping.

Doping suspension
In January 2007, she was tested positive to EPO. She received a two year suspension.

Later career
On 16 July 2010, Hind take the second place in the 1500m Diamond league Paris, she broke for the second time the National French Record 1500m, 3 min 59 s 76. At the European Athletics Championships in 2010 (1 August 2010, Hind Dehiba won the silver medal in the 1500 m in 4 min 1.17 s, losing to Spain's Nuria Fernández. A month later in Split, the French won the 1500 m very tactical Continental Cup (formerly World Cup of Nations) in the Europe team, beating out the Kenyan Olympic champion Nancy Langat in a very sprint tight. The latter suffered a drop to ten meters from the finish. She ended her season by winning the rally Carmaux (Tarn), where she established the world's best performance of the year on the mile in 4 min 29 sec 06.
 
During her career, Hind had three podiums in Diamond League (second in Paris in 2005, second in Paris in 2010 and third in Lausanne in 2011). It was ranked 4th in the World Ranking in 2005 and 2010 to 1500. She won three times France Indoor Championships 1500 m (2004-2005 and 2011), five times the championships of France Elites outdoor 1500 m (2005, 2006, 2009, 2011 and 2012) as well as championships in France 800m in 2009. She became the first and only French athlete to date to have run a 1500 m in less than 4 minutes, with a time of 3 min 59 s 76 at the Diamond League Meeting in Paris at the Stade de France on 16 July 2010. Hind ran 35 times during her career in less than 4 min 10 sec and 15 times in less than 4 min 05 s at 1500 m. In the 800 m, she ran four times in less than 2 minutes. Twice Hind ran in less than 4 min 30 sec in the mile and two times in less than 9 minutes about 3000 m.

13 October 2012, at Meaux, she was elected a member of the Steering Committee of the Board of Seine-et-Marne Athletics for a period of four years. Hind seat on the Commission's High Level Sport and chairman of the Athletes Commission.

Hind was a professional athlete for two years in the National Athletics League (LNA) from 1 January 2011 to 31 December 2012.

She graduated with honors from the University Diploma of European Physical Preparator at the University of Lyon1, Brussels and Lausanne (Degree Coach Condition Trainer).

Hind gave birth to a baby girl named Inès in Albuquerque, United States, on 23 July 2013.
On 14 November 2016 in Corbeil Essonnes (France), Hind gave birth to "triplets" named Adam, Jana and Salma.
They live in Fontainebleau, in the Paris region.
In January 2018, the IAAF informed her that she was winning the bronze medal in the 1500m at the 2012 Indoor World Championships, after the disqualification of 2 athletes for doping.

International competitions

Personal bests
800 metres - 1:58.63 min (2010)
1000 metres - 2:38.50 min Indoor(2011)
1500 metres - 3:59.76 min (2010)
One Mile - 4:29.06 min (2010)
3000 metres - 8:52.21 min (2005)

References

External links

1979 births
Living people
French female middle-distance runners
Moroccan female middle-distance runners
Olympic athletes of France
Athletes (track and field) at the 2004 Summer Olympics
World Athletics Championships athletes for France
European Athletics Championships medalists
Doping cases in athletics
French sportspeople in doping cases
Moroccan sportspeople in doping cases
Moroccan emigrants to France
Naturalized citizens of France
IAAF Continental Cup winners